Destino (Destiny) is a Mexican telenovela produced by Maricarmen Marcos for Azteca. Paola Núñez and Mauricio Islas star as the protagonists.

Episodes

References

Lists of Mexican television series episodes